The Pertusariales are an order of fungi in the class Lecanoromycetes.  It contains the following families: Coccotremataceae, Icmadophilaceae, Megasporaceae, Microcaliciaceae,  Ochrolechiaceae, Pertusariaceae, Varicellariaceae, and Variolariaceae.  Many of these fungi form lichens.

Gallery

References

 
Lichen orders
Lecanoromycetes orders
Taxa named by David Leslie Hawksworth
Taxa named by Maurice Choisy
Taxa described in 1986